"Dreaming I was Dreaming" is Namie Amuro's ninth single on the Avex Trax label. Released after the announcement of her pregnancy and marriage to SAM of the group, TRF, it debuted at #1 on December 8, 1997. The single does not appear on any of Amuro's original albums but does appear on her first compilation album, 181920 (1998). The song samples the T. Rex song "Liquid Generation". It was her last original single before taking a year leave in 1998. The single was certified double platinum by the RIAJ for 800,000 copies shipped to stores.

Commercial endorsements
"Dreaming I was Dreaming" was used in a television campaign commercial for Ginza Jewelry Maker Estate Twin Jewelry.

Track listing
 "Dreaming I was Dreaming (Straight Run)" (Marc, Tetsuya Komuro, Cozy Kubo) – 5:11
 "Dreaming I was Dreaming (congratulations)" (Remixed by Joe Chiccarelli) – 6:35
 "Dreaming I was Dreaming (Instrumental)" (Cozy Kubo) – 5:09

Personnel
 Namie Amuro – vocals, background vocals
 Tetsuya Komuro – piano

Production
 Producer – Tetsuya Komuro
 Arrangement – Cozy Kubo
 Mixing – Dave Way
 Remixing – Joe Chiccarelli

Charts
Oricon Sales Chart (Japan)

Oricon Sales Chart (Japan)

References

1997 singles
Namie Amuro songs
Oricon Weekly number-one singles
Songs written by Tetsuya Komuro
1997 songs